John Healey (born 13 February 1960) is a British Labour Party politician serving as Member of Parliament (MP) for Wentworth and Dearne, formerly Wentworth, since 1997 and Shadow Secretary of State for Defence since 2020.

Healey was Minister of State for Housing and Planning in the Brown Government.

Following the 2010 general election, he was elected to the Shadow Cabinet and was appointed Shadow Secretary of State for Health. He stood down from the role in October 2011 and was succeeded by Andy Burnham. He also served as Shadow Secretary of State for Housing from 2016 to 2020 under Jeremy Corbyn, and worked alongside Andrew Gwynne, the Shadow Secretary of State for Communities and Local Government.

Early life
John Healey was born in Wakefield, the son of Aidan Healey OBE. He was educated at the Lady Lumley's School in Pickering before attending the independent St Peter's School, York sixth form college.  Healey studied Social and Political Science at Christ's College, Cambridge where he received a BA in 1982. He worked as a journalist and the deputy editor of the internal magazine of the Palace of Westminster, The House Magazine for a year in 1983.  In 1984 he became a full-time disability rights campaigner for several national charities.

Healey joined Issues Communications in 1990 as a campaign manager before becoming the head of communications at the Manufacturing, Science and Finance trade union in 1992.  He was appointed as the campaign director with the Trades Union Congress in 1994 in which capacity he remained until his election to the House of Commons. He was also a tutor at the Open University Business School.

Healey's first venture into Parliamentary politics was an unsuccessful attempt to gain the Ryedale seat at the 1992 general election.  As the Labour candidate, Healey finished in third place, some 30,076 votes behind the sitting Conservative John Greenway.

Member of Parliament

Selection

Although John Healey had not been the first choice as the Labour candidate in Wentworth for the 1997 general election he won by a convincing margin after a long campaign.  It was rumoured that the Labour leadership had tried to insert the former Conservative MP for Stratford-on-Avon, Alan Howarth, who had crossed the floor and joined the Labour Party in 1995.

The other prospective candidates were journalist Yvette Cooper who went on to be selected for Pontefract and Castleford and Rotherham Cllrs. Ken Wyatt and Cllr. Roger Stone. Finally Healey was chosen for this very safe Labour seat.

At the 1997 general election, Healey successfully contested the seat of Wentworth, which had become available following the retirement of the Labour MP Peter Hardy.  Healey held the seat with a majority of 23,959 and has remained the MP to date, being re-elected in the 2019 General Election with a majority of 2,165.

In government
Healey served as a member of the education and employment select committee from 1997 until he became the Parliamentary Private Secretary to the Chancellor of the Exchequer Gordon Brown in 1999.  He was given an executive position following the 2001 general election in an appointment as the Parliamentary Under-Secretary of State for Adult Skills at the Department for Education and Skills.

Healey was promoted in 2002 to the position of Economic Secretary to the Treasury and nominally again following the 2005 general election when he took the role of Financial Secretary to the Treasury.

Healey's responsibilities included government statistics, (including the Office for National Statistics which is to become an independent body after passage of the current bill he has been steering through parliament), along with implementation of the government's 10 year strategy for science and innovation, which directs spending of around £5 billion a year. Inter alia, this has led to the controversial abolition of the Research Assessment Exercise. However, he has never made a speech on this area of responsibility and did not answer questions about it.

On 29 June 2007, he was moved to the Department for Communities and Local Government as a result of a government reshuffle.  His position as Financial Secretary was filled by Jane Kennedy. Shortly after his appointment he assumed responsibility for assisting the recovery from recent widespread flooding across the United Kingdom. It was announced he would be appointed to the Privy Council in October 2008.

In a Cabinet reshuffle on 5 June 2009, he was appointed Minister of State for Housing and Planning, replacing Margaret Beckett who had resigned. While Minister of State for Housing and Planning, he was criticised for suggesting that more people are renting rather than buying their own homes was a good thing.

In opposition
Healey came second in the election for the shadow cabinet in 2010, and was appointed Shadow Secretary of State for Health. Healey took the decision to stand down from the Shadow Cabinet in 2011 in order to spend more time with his family.

In 2015 three Rotherham Labour MPs, Kevin Barron, Sarah Champion and Healey, started a defamation legal action against UKIP MEP Jane Collins after Collins falsely alleged in a UKIP conference speech that the three MPs knew about child exploitation in Rotherham but did not intervene, and in February 2017 the MPs were awarded £54,000 each in damages.

Following the election of Jeremy Corbyn as Labour Party leader, Healey was appointed Shadow Minister for Housing. He supported Owen Smith in the failed attempt to replace Jeremy Corbyn in the 2016 Labour Party leadership election. Following the leadership election, Healey was appointed Shadow Secretary of State for Housing in October 2016.

Following the election of Keir Starmer Healey was appointed Shadow Secretary of State for Defence in April 2020, shadowing Ben Wallace.

Political views
Healey maintains affordable housing should be a right, not a privilege.  Healey wrote, "The housing market is broken, and, after eight long years it is clear that current Conservative housing policy is failing to fix it. Ministers talk big about housebuilding targets to be reached some time in the next decade. But what new homes we build, and who they’re for, matter just as much as how many we build.  To make housing more affordable, we need to build more affordable homes, and to hardwire housing affordability through the system, from planning to funding to delivery. The public know this: eight in 10 people think ministers should be doing more to get affordable housing built. (...) We will build for those who need it, including the very poorest and most vulnerable, with a big boost to new social rented homes. And we will also build Labour’s new affordable homes for those in work on ordinary incomes who are priced out of the housing market and being failed by housing policy. This is the “just coping” class in Britain today, who do the jobs we all rely on – IT workers, HGV drivers, joiners, warehouse managers, lab technicians, nurses, teaching assistants, call centre supervisors, shop staff."

Healey also said, "Homelessness fell at an unprecedented rate with Labour but, after eight years of the Tories, it is shameful that 131,000 children will be without a home this Christmas [Christmas 2018].  It’s no surprise that homelessness is rising rapidly when the Conservatives have slashed investment in new affordable homes, refused to help private renters and made huge cuts to housing benefit and homelessness services."

He opposes the minimum wage being set at a different level for young people and he campaigns for medals to be awarded to Suez Canal Zone veterans.

Personal life
Healey married Jackie Bate on 25 October 1993 in Lambeth and they have one son. Healey is a member of Amnesty International. He is not related to former Labour cabinet minister Denis Healey.

References

External links

 John Healey MP official constituency website

|-

|-

|-

|-

|-

|-

|-

|-

|-

1960 births
Living people
People educated at St Peter's School, York
Alumni of Christ's College, Cambridge
Academics of the Open University
Ministers of State for Housing (UK)
Labour Party (UK) MPs for English constituencies
Members of the Privy Council of the United Kingdom
Politicians from Wakefield
UK MPs 1997–2001
UK MPs 2001–2005
UK MPs 2005–2010
UK MPs 2010–2015
UK MPs 2015–2017
UK MPs 2017–2019
UK MPs 2019–present
Shadow Secretaries of State for Health